Colin Francis 'Col' Deane (11 July 1900 – 10 December 1952) was an Australian rules footballer who played for Melbourne and St Kilda in the Victorian Football League (VFL).

Deane, a rover, represented Tasmania at the 1924 Hobart Carnival. He had been in the state playing for New Town but in 1925 moved to Victoria and lined up for Melbourne. In 1926 he was a member of their premiership team and in 1929 represented the VFL at interstate football.

He didn't play in 1931 as he was in New Zealand but he returned the following year as coach of Melbourne's reserves. After steering them to the premiership, St Kilda acquired his services as playing coach in 1933. Three games into the season he retired as a player and saw out the year coaching from the sidelines.

References

Holmesby, Russell and Main, Jim (2007). The Encyclopedia of AFL Footballers. 7th ed. Melbourne: Bas Publishing.

External links

1900 births
1952 deaths
Australian rules footballers from Launceston, Tasmania
Melbourne Football Club players
St Kilda Football Club players
St Kilda Football Club coaches
Glenorchy Football Club players
Tasmanian Football Hall of Fame inductees
Melbourne Football Club Premiership players
One-time VFL/AFL Premiership players